The MLW RS-18 was an  diesel-electric locomotive built by Montreal Locomotive Works between December 1956 and August 1968. It replaced the RS-10 in MLW's catalogue, and production totalled 351 locomotives, to eight customers.

It was the Canadian version of the ALCO RS-11, although MLW did manufacture the RS-11 for Ferrocarriles Nacionales de México.

Canadian National Railway, by far the largest buyer of the RS-18, continued to specify the long hood as the front. By contrast, while all of Canadian Pacific Railway's RS-10s were long-hood-forward, all of their RS-18s were short-hood forward. All of CN and CP's locomotives were delivered with full-height short hoods, as were the first four Pacific Great Eastern Railway, and first Roberval and Saguenay Railway unit. The remaining production was for locomotives with a low short-hood, giving the train crew much better forward vision.

Original owners

Preserved 
West Chester Railroad #1803 is an ALCO RS-18 built in 1960 by the Montreal Locomotive Works for the Canadian Pacific Railway and was numbered 8762 . In 1998 it was retired from service by the Canadian Pacific Railroad and was bought by the West Chester Railroad that same year.  It was re-numbered as 1803 and repainted into a Brunswick green with a yellow frame stripe. It is currently in service.

See also 
 List of MLW diesel locomotives

References

External links
 

B-B locomotives
RS-18
Railway locomotives introduced in 1956
Standard gauge locomotives of Canada